Willy Segers (born 21 November 1958 in Anderlecht) is a Belgian politician and is affiliated to the N-VA. He was elected as a member of the Flemish Parliament in 2009.

Notes

Living people
Members of the Flemish Parliament
New Flemish Alliance politicians
1958 births
People from Anderlecht
21st-century Belgian politicians